Lipona Plantation was a cotton plantation of  in Jefferson County, Florida, United States established by Prince Achille Murat. The name is an anagram of Napoli, which Murat was the former prince of.

Plantation Specifics
The Jefferson County Florida 1860 Agricultural Census shows that Lipona Plantation had the following:

 Improved Land: 
 Unimproved Land: 
 Cash value of plantation: $8600
 Cash value of farm implements/machinery: $800
 Cash value of farm animals: $1200
 Number of slaves: 80
 Bushels of corn: N/A
 Bales of cotton: N/A

See also
 List of geographic names derived from anagrams and ananyms

References

Sources 
1860 Jefferson Co. Census

Plantations in Jefferson County, Florida
Cotton plantations in Florida